This is the discography of Scottish rock singer-songwriter Gerry Rafferty. He is best known for his solo hits "Baker Street", "Right Down the Line" and "Night Owl", as well as "Stuck in the Middle with You", recorded with the band Stealers Wheel.

Albums

Studio albums

Compilation albums

Singles

Other appearances

Notes

References

External links
 

Discographies of British artists